Lillian Shapero Rauch, (January 17, 1908 – April 19, 1988, born and died in New York City) was an American dancer and choreographer, and a member of the first Martha Graham Dance Company, where she was a performer, assistant choreographer and dancer. She was a choreographer for the musical Oy Is Dus a Leben! She was born on January 17, 1908, and died on April 19, 1988, and her husband was Maurice Rauch.

References 

1908 births
1988 deaths
20th-century American dancers
American choreographers
American women choreographers
People from New York City